Eddie Moten (born August 30, 1981) is an American football cornerback who is currently a free agent. He was signed by the Rio Grande Valley Dorados as a street free agent in 2004. He played college football at Texas A&M–Kingsville.

Moten has also played for the Philadelphia Soul and California Redwoods. He was featured on the football reality show 4th and Long in 2009.

Professional career

Rio Grande Valley Dorados
Moten signed with the Rio Grande Valley Dorados of af2 in 2004, recording 47.5 tackles, two forced fumbles, 10 interceptions and 18 pass-breakups on his way to first-team All-af2 honors.

Philadelphia Soul
Moten was a member of the Philadelphia Soul of the Arena Football League from 2005 to 2008. In 2008, Moten helped the Soul win ArenaBowl XXII. He received All-Arena honors his final three seasons in the AFL, earning first-team selections in 2006 and 2007 as well as second-team honors in 2008.

4th and Long
Moten was a member of former Dallas Cowboys wide receiver Michael Irvin's reality show 4th and Long. The winner of the show was giving the opportunity of participating in the Cowboys training camp to earn a spot on the team. Moten was the first one cut in the season finale after he had the worst stats in the game that was played.

California Redwoods
On August 18, 2009, it was announced that Moten had signed with the California Redwoods of the United Football League. He was released before the season began.

Dallas Vigilantes
Moten signed with the Dallas Vigilantes on January 8, 2010.

Portland Steel
Moten signed with the Portland Steel on February 12, 2016.

External links

Arena Football League bio

1981 births
Living people
People from Dallas
Players of American football from Texas
American football cornerbacks
American football safeties
Texas A&M–Kingsville Javelinas football players
Rio Grande Valley Dorados players
Philadelphia Soul players
Sacramento Mountain Lions players
Dallas Vigilantes players
Orlando Predators players
New Orleans VooDoo players
Las Vegas Outlaws (arena football) players
Portland Steel players